Kajang Depot (Malay: Depoh Kajang) is a railway yard serving the MRT Kajang Line in Kajang, Selangor, Malaysia.

Background and functions
The depot was built at the site of a former Radio Television Malaysia (RTM) transmitter station. 

The depot houses a central maintenance facility with overhaul functions for trains on the MRT Kajang Line only.

This is one of two yards serving the Kajang Line, the other being the Sungai Buloh yard, which is also shared with the MRT Putrajaya Line. Kajang Depot is also one of six yards in the Rapid Rail network.

Buildings and structures in Selangor
Kajang
Rail yards in Malaysia
Sungai Buloh-Kajang Line